Pavel Kováč (born 12 August 1974) is a Slovak former goalkeeper who last played for Slovak club FC ViOn Zlaté Moravce. He is 2.02 m tall and weighs 96 kg. His international debut came in the second half of the Slovakia vs. Hungary match on 6 February 2008.

Kováč previously played for FC Slovácko in the Gambrinus liga, Apollon Kalamarias F.C. in the Greek Super League and DAC Dunajská Streda.

External links
FC ViOn Zlaté Moravce

References

1. by Pavol Drábek - Pavol Kováč: "Byť v Olympiakose je zadosťučinením!"

2. by Pavol Drábek - Αποκλειστική συνέντευξη με τον Πάβελ Κόβατς 

3. by Pavol Drábek - Ο Πάβελ Κόβατς θυμάται και εύχεται

1974 births
Living people
Slovak footballers
Slovak expatriate footballers
Olympiacos F.C. players
Apollon Pontou FC players
Expatriate footballers in Greece
Super League Greece players
People from Partizánske
Sportspeople from the Trenčín Region
Association football goalkeepers
FK Dubnica players
FC DAC 1904 Dunajská Streda players
Slovak Super Liga players
1. FC Slovácko players
ŠK Slovan Bratislava players
MFK Ružomberok players
FC ViOn Zlaté Moravce players
Czech First League players